NCAA GameBreaker 2004 is a video game developed by 989 Sports and published by Sony Computer Entertainment America for PlayStation 2 in 2003. It is the last game in the NCAA GameBreaker series.

Reception

The game received "mixed" reviews, albeit less so than NCAA GameBreaker 2003, according to the review aggregation website Metacritic.

References

External links
 

2003 video games
College football video games
NCAA video games
North America-exclusive video games
PlayStation 2 games
PlayStation 2-only games
Video games developed in the United States
Video games set in 2004